Kamir Malmir (also Romanized as Kamīr Mālmīr; also known as Komeyr and Kūh Mīr) is a village in Gol Gol Rural District, in the Central District of Kuhdasht County, Lorestan Province, Iran. At the 2006 census, its population was 593, in 125 families.

References 

Towns and villages in Kuhdasht County